This list includes opera productions of the Opera Group and Opera Company of Boston from 1958 to 1990.

1958–59 
 Voyage to the Moon – Offenbach (first American performance)
 La bohème – Puccini
 The Barber of Seville – Rossini
 The Beggar's Opera – Gay

1959–60 
 Tosca – Puccini
 Voyage to the Moon – Offenbach
 Hansel and Gretel – Humperdinck
 Carmen – Bizet

1960–61 
 La traviata – Verdi
 Otello – Verdi
 Hansel and Gretel – Humperdinck
 Falstaff – Verdi
 La bohème – Puccini
 Die Fledermaus – Johann Strauss

1961–62 
 Command Performance – Robert Middleton (world premiere)
 Manon – Massenet
 Die Meistersinger von Nürnberg – Wagner
 Rigoletto – Verdi

1962–63 
 Madama Butterfly – Puccini
 The Barber of Seville – Rossini
 Faust – Gounod

1964 
 Lulu – Berg (2-act version, in English, US East Coast premiere)
 The Magic Flute – Mozart
 I Puritani – Bellini
 Madama Butterfly – Puccini
 L'Elisir d'Amore – Donizetti

1965 
 The Abduction from the Seraglio – Mozart
 Semiramide – Rossini
 Intolleranza – Nono (first American performance)
 The Tales of Hoffmann – Offenbach (in English)
 Boris Godunov – Mussorgsky (first American performance of original version)

1966 
 Don Giovanni – Mozart
 Boris Godunov – Mussorgsky
 Hippolyte et Aricie – Rameau (first American performance)
 Moses and Aron – Schoenberg (first American performance)

1967 
 Don Giovanni – Mozart
 Otello – Verdi
 The Rake's Progress – Stravinsky
 Bartók double bill:
 Bluebeard's Castle (in Hungarian)
 The Miraculous Mandarin (pantomime ballet)
 Tosca – Puccini

1968 
 Tosca – Puccini
 Lulu – Berg
 Carmen – Bizet
 La traviata – Verdi
 Falstaff – Verdi

1969 
 Bartók triple bill:
 Bluebeard's Castle (in Hungarian)
 The Miraculous Mandarin (pantomime ballet)
 The Wooden Prince (pantomime ballet)
 Lucia di Lammermoor – Donizetti
 Macbeth – Verdi (original 1847 version in Italian)
 The Marriage of Figaro – Mozart (in English)

1970 
 Der fliegende Holländer – Wagner
 La fille du régiment – Donizetti
 The Good Soldier Schweik – Kurka
 The Fisherman and His Wife – Schuller (world premiere)
 Rigoletto – Verdi

1971 
 Louise – Charpentier
 La finta giardiniera – Moazrt
 Norma – Bellini

1972 
 Les Troyens – Berlioz (first American performance of complete version)
 Tosca – Puccini
 La traviata – Verdi

1973 
 The Bartered Bride – Smetana (in English)
 The Daughter of the Regiment – Donizetti (in English)
 Aufstieg und Fall der Stadt Mahagonny – Weill
 Don Carlos – Verdi (5-act version in French, including 21 minutes of music cut from the Paris premiere)

1974 
 Don Quichotte – Massenet
 Madama Butterfly – Puccini
 War and Peace – Prokofiev (American stage premiere)
 Il barbiere di Siviglia – Rossini

1975 
 Falstaff – Verdi
 Così fan tutte – Mozart
 Benvenuto Cellini – Berlioz (first American performance)
 I Capuleti e i Montecchi – Bellini

1976 
 Fidelio – Beethoven
 Montezuma – Sessions (first American performance)
 The Girl of the Golden West – Puccini (in English)
 Macbeth – Verdi (1865 version in Italian)

1977 
 Ruslan and Ludmila – Glinka
 La bohème – Puccini (in English)
 Rigoletto – Verdi
 Orfeo ed Euridice – Gluck (in Italian)
 Orpheus in the Underworld – Offenbach (in English)

1978 
 Stiffelio – Verdi
 Damnation of Faust – Berlioz (in English)
 Don Pasquale – Donizetti
 Tosca – Puccini

1979 
 Falstaff – Verdi
 Falla double bill:
 La vida breve
 El retablo de maese Pedro
 Il barbiere di Siviglia – Rossini
 The Ice Break – Tippett (American premiere)
 Hansel and Gretel – Humperdinck

1980 
 Die Fledermaus – Johann Strauss
 Der fliegende Holländer – Wagner
 War and Peace – Prokofiev
 Aida – Verdi

1981 
 Faust – Gounod
 Der Rosenkavalier – Richard Strauss
 Rigoletto – Verdi
 Otello – Verdi

1982 
 Die Soldaten – Zimmermann (in English, American premiere)
 Aida – Verdi
 La bohème – Puccini
 Orpheus in the Underworld – Offenbach (in English)

1983 
 Carmen – Bizet
 The Invisible City of Kitezh – Rimsky-Korsakov
 Norma – Bellini
 Turandot – Puccini

1984 
 Der Freischütz – Weber
 Silver Anniversary Opera Gala with Shirley Verrett, James McCracken, and Ruth Welting
 Madama Butterfly – Puccini
 Il barbiere di Siviglia – Rossini
 Don Giovanni – Mozart
 Les contes d'Hoffmann – Offenbach

1985 
 Hansel and Gretel – Humperdinck

1986 
 Turandot – Puccini
 Taverner – Davies
 The Makropulos Case – Janáček
 Tosca – Puccini

1987 
 Il trovatore – Verdi
 Giulio Cesare – Handel
 Madama Butterfly – Puccini
 Don Pasquale – Donizetti

1988 
 Médée – Cherubini (in French with classical Greek dialog)
 Dead Souls – Shchedrin (American premiere)
 The Threepenny Opera – Weill
 La traviata – Verdi

1989 
 Mass – Bernstein
 Aida – Verdi
 Der Rosenkavalier – Richard Strauss
 La bohème – Puccini

1990 
 Madama Butterfly – Puccini
 The Magic Flute – Mozart
 The Balcony – Robert DiDomenica (world premiere)

References
Notes

Sources

Further reading
 Caldwell, Sarah & Rebecca Matlock (2008). Challenges: A Memoir of My Life in Opera. Middletown, Connecticut: Wesleyan University Press. .

Culture of Boston
History of Boston